The Island Queen is a Grade II listed public house at 87 Noel Road, Islington, London.

It was built in 1851.

References

External links
Official website
"Drink at the Island Queen": review and photograph of frontage

Grade II listed buildings in the London Borough of Islington
Grade II listed pubs in London
Pubs in the London Borough of Islington
Buildings and structures in Islington